The Milwaukee County Zoo is a zoo in Milwaukee, Wisconsin, operated by the Milwaukee County Parks Commission. It is noted for the second birth of polar bears and siamangs in captivity and for their locally famous gorilla Samson, who lived from 1950 to 1981 and whose bones are now on display at the Milwaukee Public Museum. During World War II, a celebrity animal of the zoo was Gertie the Duck and her ducklings. The zoo is also home to one of the largest group of bonobos in one location outside their native Democratic Republic of the Congo, and has two cheetahs from the National Zoo in Washington, DC.

History

The Washington Park Zoo

The West Park Zoo opened in 1892, displaying small mammals and birds. The following year, the zoo added two cinnamon bears and created an iron bear den. In 1899, the zoo constructed a $2,137 herbivore building that housed a variety of animals. Even with the Great Depression of the 1930s, the zoo prospered, creating a bear den that resembled bears' natural habitat. In 1931, the zoo's bear collection contained 37 specimens. By 1937, the Washington Park Zoo was beginning to show its age. A reptile exhibit was opened in the main zoo building in 1942. George Speidel, zoo director at this time, began planning a new zoo.

The Milwaukee County Zoo
Although still located in Washington Park, the zoo changed its name to the Milwaukee County Zoological Gardens in 1953. Fundraising took place in 1956 to offset the estimated cost for building the new zoo of US$12.6 million. The Milwaukee County Zoo opened in 1958 with the primate building, monkey island, feline house, pachyderm mall, and grizzly bear den. The zoo also opened with a  gauge miniature railway, the Zoo Line, which carried visitors around the zoo to view the exhibits and construction. The Zoo Line (now known as the Safari Train) has continued to run, operating with real steam locomotives. In 1959, construction started on the dall sheep mountain and the Alaskan bear exhibit. On May 13, 1961, the Milwaukee County Zoo officially opened to the public. Later additions included the aviary (1962), the Australian building (1963), the original animal hospital (1963), the small mammal building (1965), the aquarium (1968), and the reptile building (1968). In 1965, four Zoomobile tour trains were donated by Allis-Chalmers. This was followed by the children's zoo (1971), and the polar bear underwater viewing exhibit (1986). In 1986, the children's zoo was renamed the Stackner Heritage Farm, and a dairy complex was constructed as part of it, to celebrate Wisconsin as America's Dairyland. The complex included a cow barn, education center, and dairy store. In 1988, the Taylor Family Humboldt penguin exhibit, the education center, and the Peck Welcome Center opened. In the following years, the renovated sea lion exhibit, featuring underwater viewing, opened, and the aviary was renovated. More recent changes include the addition of the Sterns Family Apes of Africa exhibit (1992), the renovation of the aquarium and reptile building (now known as the Aquatic and Reptile Center), the renovation of the small mammal building (1998), and the addition of the Wong Family Pheasantry (1998). In 2002, Monkey Island was renovated to include a large deck for viewing, and was renamed Macaque Island. 2003 saw a newly remodeled animal health center; 2004, a new education center; and 2005 and 2006, the remodeling of the Heritage Farm, feline building, and giraffe exhibit.

The zoo's newest construction plan was a new West Entrance with a gift shop and a new North American river otter exhibit, due to the small size of the existing tank in the Small Mammal House building, in addition a new parking lot, in order to facilitate reconstruction and reconfiguration due to the rebuilding of the Zoo Interchange to the southeast of the zoo property by the Wisconsin Department of Transportation.

Exhibits

Taylor Family Humboldt Penguin Pool
This is an exhibit near the zoo's Main Entrance. This fifteen-thousand gallon tank features a group of Humboldt penguins with underwater viewing glass surrounding it.

Herb and Nada Mahler Family Aviary

The aviary contains over 60 species in a walk-through building. One section is a cageless room where birds fly free. Species in the exhibit include the Caribbean flamingo, scarlet ibis, rhinoceros hornbill, Bali mynah, crocodile bird, rockhopper penguin, gentoo penguin, red-billed hornbill, the whooping crane, Inca tern and sunbittern, as well as various pigeons and herons.

Stearns Family Apes of Africa
Opened in 1992 at the cost of $10.7 million, this indoor building features a large troop of bonobos and gorillas. For many years, Samson, the largest gorilla in captivity, was showcased in the Apes of Africa building.  The zoo maintains a bonobo breeding program with one of the largest collections of bonobos in captivity in the world. Both species have access to indoor and outdoor exhibits.

As of 2018, the zoo will have a total of four Western lowlands gorillas, after the death of 31-year-old dominant male Cassius and 17-year-old Naku in April.

Primates of the World
Adjacent to Apes of Africa, this exhibit showcases primates from the around the world, including a mandrill, Bornean orangutans, a siamang, eastern black-and-white colobus, and black-handed spider monkeys in a gallery-style exhibit. The zoo featured one of the first births of a Siamang in captivity.

Macaque Island
Macaque Island features a troop of Japanese macaques. It is a large mountain surrounded by water. It was remodeled in 2002 to include a large viewing deck for zoo guests and an expanded shelter for the resident macaques, with waterfalls and a larger mountain.

Aquatic and Reptile Center
This building holds invertebrates, fish, reptiles, and amphibians including Chinese alligators, green anacondas, Gila monsters, red-tailed boas, panther chameleons, several poison dart frogs, tomato frogs, king cobras, several other species of reptiles, amphibians, freshwater and saltwater fish.

Small Mammal Building
This building, located near the Aquatic and Reptile Center, features a special room for nocturnal species that is darkened in the day and brightened at night so the animals live on a schedule friendly to zoo visitors. Residents include the fennec fox, prehensile-tailed porcupine, common vampire bat, ring-tailed lemur, red ruffed lemurs, South African springhare, straw-coloured fruit bat,  Mohol bushbaby, Southern three-banded armadillo, Goeldi's monkeys, cotton-top tamarins, golden lion tamarins and a larger exhibit for Hoffmann's two-toed sloths. Other species are sometimes rotated in and out, such as the zoo's red pandas during construction of the Florence Mila Borchert Big Cat Country building in 2004.

North America
A series of outdoor exhibits themed around the megafauna of the North American continent featuring the grizzly bear, Alaskan brown bear, American elk, trumpeter swan, harbor seal, prairie dog, American badger, and reindeer. Many of these species like the reindeer and the grizzlys are displayed in predator-prey "panorama" exhibits, which make them appear to share the space via a hidden moat.

Northwestern Mutual Family Farm
The newly renovated children's zoo with a focus on native midwestern United States wildlife and educational presentations, featuring species such as the hedgehog, the domestic duck, the North American porcupine, red-tailed hawk and barred owl. It replaced the zoo's Stackner Heritage Farm in 2005. Northwestern Mutual Family Farm also features a two breeds of pig, the Guinea Hog and Kunekune, along with many breed of cattle such as the Ayrshire cattle, Belted Galloways, Holstein Friesian cattle, Milking Shorthorns, Scottish highland cattle and other farm animals such as Sicilian donkey, chickens, goats, rabbits and horses.

Africa/Asia/South America Mixed Exhibits

A series out of outdoor exhibits featuring animals from South America, Asia, and Africa, along with 2 new rescued American white pelicans. Some of the animals are in "panorama"-style displays in which the predator and the prey appear in the same exhibit due to hidden moats. Much of the space is currently being transformed into a multi phase project known as Adventure Africa, so the majority of the exhibits are dedicated to animals from the African savannah, including an African waterhole exhibit for the plains zebra, waterbuck, greater kudu, marabou stork, and an outdoor predator/prey setup yard for rotating spotted hyenas, and African lions, an African savannah exhibit for the pelicans, cinereous vultures, Thomson's gazelles, southern ground hornbills and an outdoor predator/prey setup yard for cheetahs, an exhibit for red river hogs, an indoor exhibit for servals, and an exhibit for reticulated giraffes. South American species include an greater rheas, Baird's tapirs, alpacas, red-footed tortoises, yellow-footed tortoises, some new capybaras and an outdoor predator/prey setup yard for jaguars. Asian species include an exhibit for Bactrian camels, Indian peafowl, and an outdoor predator/prey setup yard for Amur tigers, an exhibit for red pandas, an exhibit for snow leopards and the old black rhino exhibit now contains two Domestic yaks. The Giraffe House, part of the same exhibit area, was renovated in 2006, allowing visitors to climb a deck and come face-to-face with the zoo's reticulated giraffe herd and even feed them. The giraffe exhibit is also an exhibit that remains the same at the Adventure Africa exhibit, and in the middle of the enclosures is a building called the Florence Mila Borchert Big Cat country which has indoor and outdoor areas for the African lions, cheetahs, servals, hyenas, tigers, snow leopards, red pandas, and jaguars.

Adventure Africa
Adventure Africa phases 1 and 2 opened in spring of 2019 and the summer of 2020. The first phase is a new home for African bush elephants and 7 other animal species, four of which were transferred from their old exhibits. The new Elephant Care Center acts as an indoor shelter, recreation and training facility for the elephants, as well as a space for zoo classes and events. The elephants also have access to a 1.6 acre outdoor habitat with various enrichment opportunities, including a large watering hole and enrichment feeding walls. There are also heaters throughout the yard that allow the elephants to utilize the space during colder weather. Impala Plains is one of two mixed exhibits in Adventure Africa; it contains impalas, Grant's zebras, ostriches, and grey crowned cranes. Another exhibit, the African forest, is home to eastern bongos, crested guineafowl, and yellow-backed duikers. The second phase is a new hippo enclosure called the hippo haven, which has education boards around the exhibit, and an underwater viewing for their Hippopotamuses.

Adventure Africa phase 3 will be the final phase to the adventure Africa master plan, and it will include a new exhibit that will have a conversion to the old elephant and current rhino habitats, and turn them it into a new space for the zoo's black rhinoceroses and the new Scimitar horned oryx.

Otter Passage
Opened in Spring 2018, the otter passage is home to a group of river otters in a large exhibit with two pools for underwater viewing. It opened alongside the new West Entrance and acts similar to the Taylor Family Humboldt Penguin Pool in that is an introduction exhibit depending on which entrance visitors choose to go through.

Otto Borchert Family Special Exhibits Gallery
This building is dedicated to special or traveling exhibits.

Other Facilities

Safari Train

The  gauge rideable miniature railway, first opened in 1958, continues to transport guests around the zoo from Memorial Day through Labor Day.

The railroad began operations using live steam locomotive #82, a  locomotive built in 1957 by the Sandley Light Railway Works of Wisconsin Dells, on commission of the Milwaukee Journal for the zoo.  The #82 was later joined by #1958, a diesel locomotive built in 1959, followed by two additional steam locomotives: #1916, a  locomotive built in 1961, and #1924, a 4-6-2 locomotive built for the zoo in 1977.  The #82 was eventually withdrawn, due to being too small to pull the longer trains the zoo needed to handle the crowds, and was placed on display.  In 1989, the zoo loaned #82 to the recently rebuilt Riverside and Great Northern Railway, and later traded the engine to the R&GN for a second diesel, #1992.

Child friendly areas
Playground
Treehouse area
Dinosaur exhibit (seasonal)
Sky Trail® Ropes Courses & Zip Line
Ski Safari
Zoo Mobile
Carousel

References

External links

 
 Zoological Society of Milwaukee

Zoos in Wisconsin
15 in gauge railways in the United States
Protected areas of Milwaukee County, Wisconsin
Tourist attractions in Milwaukee
Zoos established in 1892